The Public Information Network for Electronic Services (or PINES) is the nearly statewide library consortium and its online library catalog of the Georgia Public Library Service. By June 2017, the catalog consisted of books from 284 library facilities in 143 counties across the U.S. state of Georgia with a collection size of 10.6 million items, all of which are searchable by anyone with a PINES library card which can be obtained free of charge from any PINES-participating library.

The PINES system effectively turns most of the state of Georgia into one huge library. PINES cardholders are able to request an interlibrary loan from any affiliated library, and the single statewide library card grants access to the hundreds of branches associated with the service. PINES also manages the booking of rooms, the use of remote self-check machines, allows automated search and retrieval, as well as supports RSS and Schema.org standards.

PINES developed the open-source software Evergreen, an integrated library system which it and other library consortia use to manage their online catalogs.

History

PINES development
In 1998 a white paper was created exploring the feasibility of a statewide public library card for Georgia. As Georgia had consistently ranked among the lowest states in public library funding per capita it was agreed that a universal library card could be of great benefit to the residents of Georgia as long as the affiliated libraries were unified under one single integrated library system (ILS). It was also believed that by establishing a state-wide library cost to individual library systems would be lowered as they wouldn't need to maintain their own integrated library systems, and certain tasks could be centralized through the state saving additional time.

By 1999 PINES became a reality, administered by the current Georgia Public Library Service (GPLS). It initially was used as a Y2K state-funded project to address needs of public libraries without Y2K-compliant ILS computer services. These libraries, mostly rural, were deemed not to have programs that would survive into the 21st century. Some libraries were still not automated as well. The PINES initiative would give these libraries access first, bringing their services into the modern era. Looking to complete the project before the year 2000, on April 8, 1999 the initial contract to develop the ILS was awarded to KPMG partnered with the SIRSI Corporation and Sun Microsystems.

In December 1999 the new software was finished and ready for deployment. In that same month Phase 1 of PINES went live with 98 affiliated libraries. For the next two years other libraries saw the success of PINES, and rather than replace their outdated ILS with a new independent one, requested to join the statewide system. In 2001 Phase 2 of PINES went live with an addition 111 libraries joining the service.

Evergreen development
In 2004 the GPLS decided not to renew their contract with KPMG/Sirsi after being advised that under the current software no more libraries would be able to be added to the system. As a result the GPLS explored the possibility of creating their own software, and on June 4, 2004 a press release by the state librarian outlined a two-year development plan for a new PINES ILS software called Evergreen.

The new ILS was completed and ready to go live in September 2006. On September 1, the Sirsi ILS was taken offline, and by September 5 Evergreen was up and running. Due to the success of Evergreen it was awarded the Mellon Award for Technology Collaboration in 2007 by the Andrew W. Mellon Foundation.

Since its initial release, Evergreen is now used in over 1,800 libraries around the world, including the highest-circulating library in the United States, the King County Library System.

List of library systems within PINES

Athens Regional Library System
Augusta-Richmond County Public Library System
Azalea Regional Library System
Bartram Trail Regional Library System
Brooks County Public Library
Catoosa County Library
Chattooga County Library System
Cherokee Regional Library System
Chestatee Regional Library System
Clayton County Library System
Coastal Plain Regional Library System
Conyers-Rockdale Library System
De Soto Trail Regional Library System
Dougherty County Public Library
Elbert County Public Library
Flint River Regional Library System
Greater Clarks Hill Regional Library System
Hall County Library System
Hart County Library
Henry County Library System
Houston County Public Library System
Jefferson County Library System
Kinchafoonee Regional Library System
Lake Blackshear Regional Library System
Lee County Library
Live Oak Public Libraries
Marshes of Glynn Libraries
Middle Georgia Regional Library System
Moultrie-Colquitt County Library System
Mountain Regional Library System
Newton County Library System
Northeast Georgia Regional Library System
Northwest Georgia Regional Library System
Ocmulgee Regional Library System
Oconee Regional Library System
Ohoopee Regional Library System
Okefenokee Regional Library System
Peach Public Libraries
Piedmont Regional Library System
Pine Mountain Regional Library System
Roddenbery Memorial Library
Sara Hightower Regional Library System
Satilla Regional Library System
Screven-Jenkins Regional Library System
South Georgia Regional Library
Southwest Georgia Regional Library
Statesboro Regional Public Libraries
Thomas County Public Library System
Three Rivers Regional Library System
Troup-Harris Regional Library
Twin Lakes Library System
West Georgia Regional Library
Worth County Library System

See also
There are several library systems in Georgia outside of the PINES system. Most of those are in the Atlanta metropolitan area, but the library systems of the Columbus metropolitan area are also outside of the PINES system. In February 2018, the Live Oak Public Libraries of the Savannah metropolitan area joined the PINES consortium.

List of public library systems in Georgia

References

External links 
https://gapines.org/eg/opac/home - PINES catalog

Library cataloging and classification